The Vineyard Theatre is an Off-Broadway non-profit theatre company, located at 108 East 15th Street in Manhattan, New York City, near Union Square. Its first production was in 1981. It is best known for its productions of the Tony award-winning musical Avenue Q, Paula Vogel's Pulitzer Prize-winning play How I Learned to Drive, and Jeff Bowen and Hunter Bell's Obie Award-winning musical [title of show]. The Vineyard describes itself as "dedicated to new work, bold programming and the support of artists." The company is the recipient of special Obie, Drama Desk and Lucille Lortel awards for Sustained Excellence, and the 1998 Jonathan Larson Performing Arts Foundation Grant. It celebrated its 25th anniversary in 2007.

Other notable productions include Edward Albee's Three Tall Women, Nicky Silver's Pterodactyls, Becky Mode's Fully Committed, Craig Lucas's The Dying Gaul, Christopher Shinn's Where Do We Live, Cornelius Eady's Brutal Imagination, Gina Gionfriddo's After Ashley, the Laura Nyro musical Eli's Comin, and Kander and Ebb's The Scottsboro Boys. In 2000 it hosted a limited engagement of Craig Bohmler and Marion Adler's musical Enter the Guardsman, which had won the international Musical of the Year award and had premiered in London's West End.

The Vineyard is also home to the Vineyard Community of Artists, an alliance of playwrights, composers, actors, designers, and directors. It sponsors panel discussions, guest speakers, informal readings of works-in-progress and full readings of new plays.

References

Off-Broadway theaters
Theatre companies in New York City